Ramal de Sines is a closed railway branch line which connected the stations of Ortiga, on the Linha de Sines, and Sines, in Portugal. It was opened 14 September 1936.

See also 
 List of railway lines in Portugal
 History of rail transport in Portugal

References

Sources
 

Iberian gauge railways
Railway lines in Portugal
Railway lines opened in 1936